Nunatak Island is an uninhabited island in the Qikiqtaaluk Region of Nunavut, Canada. It is located at the northern end of Baffin Island's Cumberland Sound, at the junction of Shark Fiord and Clearwater Fiord. Southeast is Kekertelung Island. Anarnittuq Island, Clear Passage Island, and Iglunga Island are also located within this vicinity.

References

External links 
 Nunatak Island in the Atlas of Canada - Toporama; Natural Resources Canada

Islands of Baffin Island
Islands of Cumberland Sound
Uninhabited islands of Qikiqtaaluk Region